Donald or Don Fletcher may refer to:

Donald Fletcher, 19th century real estate businessman
Don Fletcher (ice hockey) (born 1931), Canadian ice hockey player
Don Fletcher, character in All Over Town
Don Fletcher (footballer) (born 1958), Australian rules footballer for Hawthorn